Joseph Peter Maria Stern, FBA (25 December 1920 – 18 November 1991) was an authority on German literature.

Born into a Jewish family, he was educated in Prague, Vienna and St. John's College, Cambridge, where he took his MA in 1947. During the war he served in the Czechoslovakian army in exile. He took up a lectureship at Bedford College, London, and then at Cambridge in 1952, returning to St. John's.

He was Professor of German at University College London from 1972 to 1986. A prolific scholar of nineteenth- and twentieth-century German literature, he wrote on Nietzsche, Kafka, Jünger, Rilke and Mann, and edited the series Landmarks in World Literature. One of his most influential works was On Realism (1973). He was also known for his study Hitler: The Führer and the People, which was translated into several languages.

He married Sheila McMullan (23 June 1922 – 16 November 2005) in 1944, having met her as a student in 1940.

He was cremated on 25 November 1991 at Cambridge Crematorium, and his ashes were interred at the Parish of the Ascension Burial Ground in Cambridge. His wife's ashes, following her cremation on 29 November 2005, are also interred there.

Works

Leibniz and the Seventeenth-Century Revolution by R. W. Meyer (1952) (translator)
Ernst Jünger: A Writer of Our Time (1953)
Lichtenberg: A Doctrine of Scattered Occasions Reconstructed from His Aphorisms and Reflections (1959)
Re-interpretations: Seven Studies in Nineteenth-Century German Literature (1964)
Liebelei/Leutnant Gustl/Die Letzten Masken by Arthur Schnitzler (1966) (editor)
Thomas Mann (1967)
Idylls & Realities: Studies in Nineteenth-Century German Literature (1971) (editor)
On Realism (1973)
Hitler: the Führer and the people (1975)
Nietzsche (Fontana Modern Masters, 1978)
Nietzsche: His Life, Work, Writings and Ideas (1978)
A Study of Nietzsche (1979)
The World of Franz Kafka (1980) (editor)
Nietzsche on Tragedy (1981) (with M. S. Silk)
Nietzsche: Die Moralität der äußeren Anstrengung (1982)
Paths and Labyrinths: Nine Papers read at a Kafka Symposium (1985) (editor with J. J. White)
The Heart of Europe: Essays on Literature and Ideology (1992)
The Dear Purchase: A Theme in German Modernism (1995)

References
Ritchie Robertson, An appreciation of the work of Siegbert Prawer, J. P. Stern and George Steiner, in Stephen D. Dowden and Meike G. Werner (eds), German Literature, Jewish Critics: The Brandeis Symposium (Rochester, NY: Camden House, 2002), pp. 237–61
M. Beddow, J. P. Stern: a memoir. Proceedings of the British Academy

Notes

External links
 

1920 births
1991 deaths
British literary theorists
British people of Czech-Jewish descent
Writers from Prague
Academics of University College London
Alumni of St John's College, Cambridge
Academics of Bedford College, London
Fellows of the British Academy
Czechoslovak emigrants to the United Kingdom
Czechoslovak expatriates in Austria